Huancaspata or Wankapata (Quechua wanka stone pata elevated place / edge, bank (of a river), shore) is one of thirteen districts of the province Pataz in Peru.

References